Gabriel Lima may refer to:

 Gabriel Lima (footballer, born 1978), Brazilian football striker
 Gabriel Lima (futsal player) (born 1987), Italian futsal player
 Gabriel Lima (footballer, born 1996), Brazilian football forward